Evergreen Mak Cheung-ching (born 18 December 1968), better known as Makbau (麥包), is a Hong Kong actor. He had been an actor with TVB for more than 30 years.

Early life 
Mak was born in Shunde District, Foshan, China, and his ancestral hometown is Qingyuan, Guangdong province.

Career 
Mak was praised for his portrayal of the main antagonist, Leung Fei-fan (Fei Fan Gor), in the 2010 TVB drama No Regrets, for which he won the TVB Anniversary Award for Best Supporting Actor. He also won the Best Actor in a Supporting Role award in the Asian Television Awards 2011 for the same role.  

He is also known for his voiceover work for cartoons, as well a children show host for Flash Fax and After School ICU.

Mak made his mainland China debut in May 2021 after working with TVB for three decades. His final acting role with TVB was in 2015's Captain of Destiny and he left TVB in 2019 when his contract expired. He was one of a score of former TVB artists who moved following a lack of opportunities in Hong Kong with the 2019–2020 Hong Kong protests and the COVID-19 pandemic in Hong Kong.

Filmography

Film

Television dramas

Host

Awards
 2010: 43rd TVB Anniversary Awards Ceremony - Best Supporting Actor award (No Regrets)
 2011: 16th Asian Television Awards - Best Supporting Actor award (No Regrets)

References

External links
 Official TVB Blog of Evergreen Mak
 
 Evergreen Mak at the Hong Kong Movie DataBase

 
|-
! colspan="3" style="background: #DAA520;" | TVB Anniversary Awards
|-

1968 births
Living people
Hong Kong male film actors
Hong Kong male television actors
People from Foshan
Male actors from Guangdong
20th-century Hong Kong male actors
21st-century Hong Kong male actors
Chinese male film actors
Chinese male television actors
20th-century Chinese male actors
21st-century Chinese male actors